The Butterfly Garden or Jardin des Papillons is located in Grevenmacher in eastern Luxembourg. Owned by the elisabeth group, the indoor site presents over 40 species of butterflies in 600 square meters of natural surroundings .

External links
Butterfly Garden website

References

Tourist attractions in Luxembourg
Grevenmacher
Butterfly houses
Articles needing infobox zoo